The 59th Alabama Infantry Regiment was an infantry regiment of the Confederate States Army during the American Civil War.

Organization
The regiment was formed on November 25, 1863 at Charleston, Tennessee by consolidating the 2nd Infantry and the 4th Artillery Battalions, Hilliard's Alabama Legion.

Service
The regiment served in Gracie's Alabama Brigade in the Department of East Tennessee participating in Longstreets Knoxville Campaign and later the Army of Northern Virginia in the Siege of Petersburg. During the latter campaign, the Regiment lost its battle flag during the Battle of Hatcher's Run in February 1865, but the regiment went on to surrender at Appomattox Courthouse on April 9, 1865.

Staff officers
 Colonel Bolling Hall III. 
 Lieut. Colonel John D. McLennan 
 Lieut. Colonel Geo. W. Huguley
 Major Geo. W. Huguley 
 Major Lewis H. Crumpler
 Lt. Crenshaw Hall, adjutant

Field officers
 John C. Hendrix 
 S. E. A. Reaves
 John F. Wise
 CJohn E. Hall
 W. Dillard
 John Porter.
 E. L. McIntyre
 John A. Henley.
 W. H. Stuckey 
 W. J. Peacock.
 L. H. Crumpier
 W.R. Davie
 James Lang
 R. Glasgow
 Louis Harrell
 H. H. Rutledge 
 Zach. Daniel
 R. F. Manly
 W. D. Walden
 R. H. Gulledge.

See also
List of Alabama Civil War Confederate units

References

Further reading
 Burton, John Michael. Gracie's Alabama Volunteers: The History of the Fifty-Ninth Alabama Volunteer Regiment. Gretna, La.: Pelican Pub, 2003. 
 Dedmondt, Glenn. The Flags of Civil War Alabama. Louisiana: Pelican Publishing, 2001. 
 Sifakis, Stewart. Compendium of the Confederate Armies: Alabama. New York: Facts on File, 1992

External links
 59th Regiment, Alabama Infantry, NPS

Units and formations of the Confederate States Army from Alabama
1863 establishments in Alabama
Military units and formations established in 1863
1865 disestablishments in Virginia
Military units and formations disestablished in 1865